Rauf Janbakhish oghlu Abdullayev (29 October 1937) is a chief conductor of Azerbaijan State Symphony Orchestra, professor, People's Artist of the Azerbaijan SSR, laureate of the State Prize of the Azerbaijan SSR, Istiglal Order and "Golden Plane" international award.

Biography 
Rauf Abdullayev was born on October 29, 1937 in Baku. He graduated from Hajibeyov Azerbaijan State Conservatoire (1959) and Leningrad State Conservatory (1965) in conducting.

He was the chief conductor of Azerbaijan State Academic Opera and Ballet Theater from 1965 to 1984, art director and chief conductor of Ankara State Opera and Ballet Theater in 1991–1994 and since 1984 he is the art director and chief conductor of Azerbaijan State Symphony Orchestra. In the 1970s he was one of the founders of Modern Music Chamber Orchestra and the BAKARA ensemble.

For more than 20 years he has conducted about 30 opera and ballet performances (both classical and modern repertoire) as the chief conductor of the theater. He performed in many countries with famous collectives (Russia, Germany, Netherlands, Switzerland, France, Turkey, Egypt, United States, Italy, Dubai, etc.). His repertoire includes works by many Western European, Russian and Azerbaijani composers.

R. Abdullayev is the brother of conductor Kamal Abdullayev.

Awards 

Rauf Abdullayev was twice awarded the title of "Best Conductor of the Year" in Turkey for his work as a conductor at Ankara State Opera and Ballet Theater, where he worked as chief conductor from 1993 to 1997.

Filmography

References 

Saint Petersburg Conservatory alumni
Baku Academy of Music alumni
1937 births
Azerbaijani conductors (music)
Living people
Honored Art Workers of the Azerbaijan SSR